"It's Easy for You" is a song by American musician Elvis Presley, released in 1977 by RCA Records as the final track on his final studio album, Moody Blue. It was written by Andrew Lloyd Webber and  Tim Rice and  produced by Felton Jarvis.

It was recorded in the 'Jungle Room' of Presley's Graceland mansion.

Elvis Presley songs
1977 songs
Songs with music by Andrew Lloyd Webber
Songs with lyrics by Tim Rice
Song recordings produced by Felton Jarvis